1990 Emmy Awards may refer to:

 42nd Primetime Emmy Awards, the 1990 Emmy Awards ceremony honoring primetime programming
 17th Daytime Emmy Awards, the 1990 Emmy Awards ceremony honoring daytime programming
 18th International Emmy Awards, the 1990 Emmy Awards ceremony honoring international programming

Emmy Award ceremonies by year